The twelfth season of the television series Dallas aired on CBS during the 1988–89 TV season.

Cast

Starring
In alphabetical order:
 Barbara Bel Geddes as Miss Ellie Ewing Farlow (20 episodes)
 Patrick Duffy as Bobby Ewing (26 episodes)
 Linda Gray as Sue Ellen Ewing (26 episodes)
 Larry Hagman as J.R. Ewing (26 episodes)
 Steve Kanaly as Ray Krebbs (5 episodes)
 Howard Keel as Clayton Farlow (22 episodes)
 Ken Kercheval as Cliff Barnes (25 episodes)
 Charlene Tilton as Lucy Ewing Cooper (20 episodes)
 Sheree J. Wilson as April Stevens (24 episodes)

Also Starring
 George Kennedy as Carter McKay (26 episodes)
 Cathy Podewell as Cally Harper Ewing (21 episodes)
 Beth Toussaint as Tracey Lawton (16 episodes)
 Ian McShane as Don Lockwood (13 episodes)
 William Smithers as Jeremy Wendell (8 episodes)
 Andrew Stevens as Casey Denault (7 episodes)
 Audrey Landers as Afton Cooper Van Buren (5 episodes)
 Leigh Taylor-Young as Kimberly Cryder (1 episode)

Notable guest stars
Leigh McCloskey returns as Mitch Cooper for one episode, without being credited as "also starring" - making him the only Dallas example of a billing demotion from also starring status to guest star. Gayle Hunnicutt joins the cast as Vanessa Beaumont for three episodes, while other additions to the cast include Jeri Gaile (Rose Daniels McKay), J. Eddie Peck (Tommy McKay) and John Hoge (Detective Ratagan). 

Margaret Michaels makes one appearance as former main character Pamela Barnes Ewing, and Jenna Pangburn appears in two episodes as Pamela Rebecca Cooper, a character played by Deborah Kellner in the 1996 television film Dallas: J.R. Returns and Julie Gonzalo in the 2012 Dallas revival series.

Although Dallas has had no crossovers with its spin-off series Knots Landing since the ninth series, Joan Van Ark features in uncredited archive footage as Valene Clements in the episode "Comings and Goings".

DVD release
The twelfth season of Dallas' was released by Warner Bros. Home Video, on a Region 1 DVD box set of three double-sided DVDs, on January 19, 2010. Like the other DVD sets of the show's last five seasons, it does not include any extras.

Episodes

References

General references

External links 

1988 American television seasons
1989 American television seasons
Dallas (1978 TV series) seasons